Bogaczów  is a village in the administrative district of Gmina Męcinka, within Jawor County, Lower Silesian Voivodeship, in south-western Poland.

Notable residents

 Chris Strachwitz (born 1931), German-American music producer

References

Villages in Jawor County